Sword and Shield (German: Zopf und Schwert - Eine tolle Prinzessin) is a 1926 German silent historical romance film directed by Victor Janson and Rudolf Dworsky and starring Mady Christians, William Dieterle and Albert Steinrück. It is in the Prussian films tradition.

The film's sets were designed by Ernst Stern.

Cast
 Mady Christians as Prinzessin Wilhelmine  
 William Dieterle as Erbprinz von Bayreuth
 Albert Steinrück as Friedrich Wilhelm I, König von Preußen
 Hanni Weisse as Von Sonnsfeld, Hofdame der Prinzessin  
 Julia Serda as Sophie Dorothea, Königin von Preußen
 Walter Janssen as Kronprinz Friedrich
 Harry Hardt as Graf Kayserlingk  
 Robert Scholz as Hotham, englischer Gesandter  
 Julius Falkenstein as Graf Seckendorf, kaiserl. -österreichisch. Gesandter
 Rudolf Lettinger as General von Grumbkow  
 Paul Biensfeldt as Eversmann, Kammerdiener des Königs 
 Max Gülstorff as Laharpe  
 Theodor Loos as Eckhoff, Unteroffizier  
 Wilhelm Diegelmann as Silberwäscher des Königs  
 Sophie Pagay as Seine Frau

References

Bibliography
 Grange, William. Cultural Chronicle of the Weimar Republic. Scarecrow Press, 2008.

External links

1926 films
Films of the Weimar Republic
German silent feature films
Films directed by Victor Janson
Films directed by Rudolf Dworsky
1920s historical romance films
German historical romance films
Films set in the 1730s
Prussian films
German films based on plays
German black-and-white films
1920s German films
1920s German-language films
Silent historical romance films